Oliver Law (October 23, 1900 – July 9, 1937) was an African-American communist and labor organizer, who fought for the Republic in the Spanish Civil War. He was the commander of the Abraham Lincoln Battalion for several days and commander of its Machine Gun Company for much longer.

Background
Born in west Texas, Law joined the US Army in 1919. He stayed on until 1925. He served as a private in the 24th Infantry Regiment, an Afro-American outfit on the Mexican border. After leaving the army, he went to Bluffton, Indiana, where he worked in a cement plant. He moved on to Chicago, where he drove a taxi with the Yellow Cab Company. In the Great Depression he found work as a stevedore and joined the International Longshoremen's Association. He then tried his luck with a small restaurant, but failed and got a job with the Works Project Administration. Law was a member of the International Labor Defense and joined the Communist Party (CP) in 1932. In 1930 he was very active in the unemployment movement.

Law worked with  Harry Haywood to organize mass protests against Italy's occupation of Ethiopia at the Second Italo-Abyssinian War. He was arrested speaking at a demonstration in Chicago on August 31, 1935.

Law was married to Corrine Booker Light-foot, mother of the regional Communist Party of the USA (CPUSA) leader Claude Light-foot.

Spanish Civil War
In 1936 Law joined the Abraham Lincoln Brigade. He arrived in Spain on January 16, 1937, to fight for the Popular Front against Francisco Franco and the Nationalists. Having met the International Brigades at Albacete, Law first served as a group leader of a machine-gun company engaged on the Jarama front. There were three group leaders, under the two section leaders and the company officers.

After failing to take Madrid by frontal assault, General Francisco Franco gave orders for the road that linked the city to the rest of Republican Spain to be cut. A Nationalist force of 40,000 men, including men from the Army of Africa, crossed the Jarama River on February 11, 1937. General José Miaja sent three International Brigades to the Jarama Valley to block the advance. Law first saw action on February 17. After disastrous setbacks on February 27, Law had performed well on the day and was soon promoted to section leader. Two weeks later he was made commander of the machine-gun company, when his superior officer was killed. The battalion leadership was annihilated at Jarama and Law advanced fast in rank, even though there was some criticism of his performance at the attack on Villanueva de la Cañada.

The experienced battalion commander Martin Hourihan recognized Law's abilities and wanted to send him to officer's training school. When Hourihan became ill, Law was chosen to replace him temporarily. After Houridan transferred permanently to the regimental staff, the choice of battalion commander was between Law and Walter Garland, who was still recovering from wounds, and Law was chosen and led the Abraham Lincoln Battalion in the first days of the Battle of Brunete. At the beginning of July the Popular Front government launched a major attack to relieve the threat to Madrid. General Vicente Rojo Lluch sent the Republican Army to Brunete, challenging Nationalist control of the western approaches to the capital. The 80,000 Republican soldiers made good early progress, but they were brought to a halt when General Francisco Franco brought up his reserves.

The Internationals also suffered heavy losses. Oliver Law was killed on July 9th, leading his men in an attack on Mosquito Crest (Mosquito Hill).

References

External links
Eslanda Goode Robeson's diary excerpt of Oliver Law's story, as told by "K"
Abraham Lincoln Brigade Archives
African Americans in the Spanish Civil War
 "Paul Robeson, The Spanish Civil War and the Oliver Law film that never was"

1900 births
1937 deaths
People from Texas
African-American military personnel
American communists
Military personnel killed in the Spanish Civil War
Abraham Lincoln Brigade members
United States Army soldiers
Members of the Communist Party USA
American anti-fascists
People from Bluffton, Indiana
African-American communists